Molar may refer to:

Molar (tooth), a kind of tooth found in mammals
Molar (grape), another name for the Spanish wine grape Listan Negro
Molar (unit), a unit of concentration equal to 1 mole per litre
Molar mass
Molar volume
El Molar, Tarragona, a village in the comarca (county) of Priorat, province of Tarragona in the autonomous region of Catalonia, Spain
El Molar, Madrid, a town in the north of the Community of Madrid in the road to Burgos, after San Agustín de Guadalix

See also
 Moler, a power-pop band from Australia
 Moler (surname)